David Denholm, Ph.D. (1924 – 19 June 1997) was an Australian author and historian who published fiction under the pseudonym David Forrest, and history under his own name.

He is perhaps best known for his book on Australian history, The Colonial Australians.  John Hirst, writing in The Monthly in 2006, placed it on his brief list of the best Australian history books of all-time.  Elsewhere, Hirst describes The Colonial Australians as an "underrated" work that "explores... the nature of colonial society by examining its physical remains," and Denholm as the historian who "best understands" the sense in which that the culture of a colony is as old as the culture of the mother country.

He first came to national and international attention with his debut novel, The Last Blue Sea (1959), about the conflict between Australia and Japan during World War II.  The novel, which emphasized the difficulty the Anzacs experienced in fighting in the heat and rain of New Guinea,  has been called "the classic short novel of the New Guinea campaign."  He also wrote   The Hollow Woodheap (1962), and a notable short story The Barambah Mob (1963), a humorous (and often anthologised) cricketing tale.   His book length essay, The Colonial Australians (1975) was a bestseller. The Last Blue Sea won the first Mary Gilmore Prize.

Denholm was a scholarship boy at the Brisbane Church of England Grammar School. He fought in World War II with the 59th Battalion (Australia).

Denholm was an adult learner who entered Queensland University in 1964, graduating in 1967. He went on to earn the PhD in history at the Australian National University in 1972.  He taught at the University of New England, and then, after 1974, at the Riverina College of Advanced Education, of Charles Sturt University. Denholm continues to research on Australian and family history until he died, after a short illness, in 1997.

Bibliography

Novels

All as by David Forrest

 The Last Blue Sea (1959)
 The Hollow Woodheap (1962)

Criticism

 Patrick White (1962)

Published letters

 Corresponding voices : the letters of Bill Scott and David Denholm, 1963-1997. edited by Zita Denholm. 2000.

References

20th-century Australian novelists
20th-century Australian male writers
Australian male novelists
Australian male short story writers
Australian textbook writers
1924 births
1997 deaths
20th-century Australian short story writers